Nora Perry may refer to:
 Nora Perry (writer) (1831–1896), American poet and writer
 Nora Perry (badminton) (born 1954), English former badminton player